Cousins House in Newberry, South Carolina was built in 1880. It was listed on the National Register of Historic Places in 1980.

References

Houses on the National Register of Historic Places in South Carolina
Newberry, South Carolina
Second Empire architecture in South Carolina
Houses completed in 1880
Houses in Newberry County, South Carolina
National Register of Historic Places in Newberry County, South Carolina